Duran Duran is an English new wave band.

Duran Duran may also refer to:

Works by Duran Duran
 Duran Duran (1981 album)
 Duran Duran (1993 album), also unofficially known as The Wedding Album
 Duran Duran (1983 video)

Other uses
 Durand Durand, a fictional character, after whom the band is named, from the 1968 film Barbarella
 "Duran Duran" (song), a song by Jenni Vartiainen

Duran Duran